Universitarios Football Club, also known as Universitarios FC, or UFC, is an American soccer club located in Albuquerque, New Mexico. It was founded in 2007 by international grad students of the University of New Mexico. The club started playing in the third division of the Albuquerque Soccer League in the season 2007/2008 where they got the sixth position. The club won the third division in the season 2008/2009, also winning the award of the best defense in the league.

On Sunday, April 25, 2010, and with one game still pending, the club won the second division of the season 2009/2010. The club was then promoted to first division in the 2010/2011 season and finished the season in 18th place in the division. In the 2011/2012 season the club finished 13th after a hard fought season and improving from last years performance. In the 2012/2013 season the club finished second behind the title winners whom were a premier team that failed to be put into their division. They won with 119 goals scored with the club only losing to them by two goals. In the 2013/2014 season, the club finished second behind their arch rivals Perspolis in a very tight run for the title. In the 2014/2015 season, the club took first place as the division champions with 84 goals scored in all competitions. The club faces new challenges as the reigning champions with five premier teams in the mix for the 2015/2016 season.

History
The club was founded on July 1, 2007 by grad students of the University of New Mexico. The original idea of creating a team based on the international students at University of New Mexico, mostly Peruvians, was proposed by Attilio Ferrari (Peruvian) in 2006. It was in the Summer of 2007 when Simon Barriga, Victor Murray, Sergio Murillo, Eduardo Castro (all Peruvians), Alexandre Franco (Brazilian) and Amadeo Casas (Spain) joined Attilio Ferrari to found the team.

The team was then composed by international graduate students from all around the world: Peru, Spain, Chile, Brazil, Argentina, France, Ecuador, United States, Mexico, Colombia, etc.

Current Players 2015/2016 season

Brazil
 / Daniel Cabral
  Noe Nobrega

Colombia
  Jair Ballesteros
  Jose Gechem
  Juan Felipe Gechem
  Ricardo Gonzalez

Honduras
  Francisco Garcia

Iran
  Amirkaveh Mojtahed

Japan
  Takeo Ichihara

Mexico
  Diego Carbajal
  Fabian Carbajal

Panama
  Sergio Gomez

Spain
  Jose A. Gomez

United States of America
  Brian Ritter
  Daniel Becchi
  Matthew Foust

Venezuela
  Rade Stoisavlejevic

Past Players

Argentina
  Bruno Gallo

Brazil
  Alexandre Franco
  Carlos Hiroshi
  Italo Neide

Chile
  Jorge Pezoa
  David Ramirez
  Fernando Torres

Colombia
  Camilo Gamboa
  Alejandro Mudvi

Ecuador
  Jose Holguin
  Francisco Rodriguez
  Martin Rodriguez

Equatorial Guinea
  Luciano Ela

France
  David Barnes

Italy
  Paolo Botta
  Stefano Zucca

Mexico
  Arturo Cordova
  Daniel Jimenez
  Ulises Martinez

Peru
  Simon Barriga
  Eduardo Castro
  Attilio Ferrari
  Sergio Murillo
  Victor Murray

Spain
  Amadeo Casas

United States of America
  Mauro Bettini
  Anthony Cabrera
  Matt Hall
  Erich Melville
  Craig Milroy

See also 
New Mexico Lobos men's soccer

References

Association football clubs established in 2007
Soccer clubs in New Mexico
Sports in Albuquerque, New Mexico
2007 establishments in New Mexico